Nikita Konstantinovich Lobintsev (born 21 November 1988 in Yekaterinburg) is a Russian freestyle swimmer, who won the silver medal in the 4 × 200 m freestyle relay at the 2008 Summer Olympics. At that Olympics, he also competed in the 400 m freestyle, finishing in 8th, and the 1500 m freestyle, finishing in 31st.

He was part of the Russian team that won the bronze medal in the 4 x 100 m freestyle at the 2012 Summer Olympics, also competing in the individual 100 m freestyle.

At the 2016 Olympics, he competed in the men's 200 m freestyle.

References

External links
 
 
 
 

1988 births
Living people
Russian male swimmers
Olympic swimmers of Russia
Olympic silver medalists for Russia
Olympic bronze medalists for Russia
Swimmers at the 2008 Summer Olympics
Swimmers at the 2012 Summer Olympics
Swimmers at the 2016 Summer Olympics
Sportspeople from Yekaterinburg
World record holders in swimming
Olympic bronze medalists in swimming
Russian male freestyle swimmers
World Aquatics Championships medalists in swimming
Medalists at the FINA World Swimming Championships (25 m)
European Aquatics Championships medalists in swimming
Medalists at the 2012 Summer Olympics
Medalists at the 2008 Summer Olympics
Olympic silver medalists in swimming
Universiade medalists in swimming
Universiade gold medalists for Russia
Universiade silver medalists for Russia
Medalists at the 2007 Summer Universiade
Medalists at the 2013 Summer Universiade